San Marino competed at the 2014 Summer Youth Olympics, in Nanjing, China from 16 August to 28 August 2014.

Shooting

San Marino was given a quota to compete by the tripartite committee.

Individual

Team

Swimming

San Marino qualified two swimmers.

Boys

Girls

References

2014 in Sammarinese sport
Nations at the 2014 Summer Youth Olympics
San Marino at the Youth Olympics